Kunzelmann is a German surname. Notable people with the surname include:

Dieter Kunzelmann (1939–2018), German activist
Stephan Kunzelmann (born 1978), German swimmer

German-language surnames